Nizhniye Lipki is a rural locality (a khutor) in Pisaryovskoye Rural Settlement, Frolovsky District, Volgograd Oblast, Russia. The population was 48 as of 2010.

Geography 
Nizhniye Lipki is located in southeast of Frolovsky District, on Shiryay River, 40 km southeast of Prigorodny (the district's administrative centre) by road. Pisarevka is the nearest rural locality.

References 

Rural localities in Frolovsky District